Section 420 in the Indian Penal Code deals with Cheating and dishonestly inducing delivery of property.  The maximum punishment which can be awarded under this section is imprisonment for a term of 7 year and fine.

Definitions

 Cheating and dishonestly inducing delivery of property.: Whoever cheats and thereby dishonestly induces the person deceived to deliver any property to any person, or to make, alter or destroy the whole or any part of a valuable security, or anything which is signed or sealed, and which is capable of being converted into a valuable security, shall be punished with imprisonment of either description for a term which may extend to seven years, and shall also be liable fine.

Distinction Between 'Cheating' and 'Breach of Contract' 
Distinction between mere 'breach of contract' and the 'offense of cheating' is a fine one. It depends upon the intention of the accused at the time of inducement which may be judged by his subsequent conduct but for this subsequent conduct is not the sole test. Mere breach of contract cannot give rise to criminal prosecution for cheating unless fraudulent or dishonest intention is shown right at the beginning of the transaction, that is the time when the offence is said to have been committed. Therefore, it is the intention of cheating which is the gist of the offence. To hold a person guilty of cheating, it is necessary to show that he had fraudulent or dishonest intention at the time of committing the act.

Distinction Between 'Cheating' and 'Misrepresentation' 

A mere representation, which is neither claimed or alleged to be dishonest or fraudulent would not attract the charge of cheating only because the complainant parts with his money on the basis thereof.

Punishment of an offence under Section 420 
The maximum punishment for an offence under section 420 of IPC is imprisonment for a term which may extend to seven years, with or without monetary fine.

In popular culture
The term "420"(read as Char Sau Bees in Hindi) is used in India to refer to a confidence trickster. This section was also in use in other neighboring countries such as Pakistan, Myanmar, where the term 420 persists in popular culture to this date. In the Nigerian Criminal Code, the same offence is covered by article 419, which has now lent its name to the advance fee fraud.

The title of two popular Hindi films - Chachi 420 (in English: Trickster Aunt, a 1997 remake of Mrs. Doubtfire) and Shri 420 (in English: Mr. 420, a 1955 film), are direct references to Section 420 of the IPC.

References 

Sections of the Indian Penal Code